The Chinese Docking Mechanism is a spacecraft docking mechanism based on the Androgynous Peripheral Attach System (APAS). There have been contradicting reports by the Chinese on its compatibility with APAS. It is used by Shenzhou spacecraft, beginning with an uncrewed Shenzhou 8, to dock to Tiangong-1. Subsequent crewed missions docked with the Tiangong-1, Tiangong-2 and the Tiangong space station. Similar docking mechanism was also introduced to the Tianzhou cargo spacecraft. Tianzhou 1 was the first cargo spacecraft which docked with the Tiangong-2. The androgynous variant has a mass of 310 kg and the non-androgynous variant has a mass of 200 kg.

See also

 Docking and berthing of spacecraft
 International Docking System Standard

References

Space program of the People's Republic of China
Spacecraft docking systems